Night of the Comet is a 1984 American science fiction comedy horror film  written and directed by Thom Eberhardt.  It stars Catherine Mary Stewart, Robert Beltran, and Kelli Maroney as survivors of a comet that has turned most people into either dust or zombies.  Night of the Comet grossed $14.4 million in the US on a $700,000 budget.  It has a Rotten Tomatoes approval rating of 79% and has since become a cult film, influencing the creation of Buffy Summers.

Plot
The Earth is passing through the tail of a comet, an event which has not occurred in 65 million years and coincided with the extinction event that wiped out the dinosaurs. On the night of the comet's passage, eleven days before Christmas, large crowds gather outside to watch and celebrate.

Eighteen-year-old Regina "Reggie" Belmont works at a movie theater in southern California. She is annoyed to find the initials DMK have the sixth highest score on the theater's Tempest video game; all the other high scores are hers. She stays after the theater closes to help her boyfriend Larry, the theatre's projectionist, sneak back in so he can loan out a film reel for illegal duplication for his own profit. He offers to pay for her assistance from what he expects to earn when the other party returns the film reel in the morning. Reggie and Larry spend the night in the steel-lined projection booth and have sex.

Meanwhile, Reggie's 16-year-old sister Samantha "Sam" argues with their stepmother Doris, who Sam implies is cheating on her father, who is away on active military duty. After this escalates to a physical altercation, Sam spends the night in a steel backyard shed.

The next morning, a gloomy reddish haze covers the sky, and there are no signs of life but piles of red dust and heaps of clothing everywhere. Unaware that anything has occurred, Larry goes outside and is killed by a zombie wielding a pipe wrench. After playing the video game to replace DMK's initials with her own, Reggie goes looking for Larry outside, mistaking the red overcast sky as bad smog. She quickly encounters the zombie, but escapes on Larry's motorcycle. She heads home to find her sister, and they surmise that because they both spent the night in steel containers, they were saved from the comet's effects.

The sisters race to the local radio station after they hear a disc jockey on air, only to find it was a pre-recorded show. They come across another survivor there, Hector Gomez, who spent the night in the back of his steel truck. When Sam talks into the microphone, she is heard by researchers in an underground installation out in the desert. As they listen to Reggie, Sam and Hector debate what to do, the scientists note that the zombies, though less exposed to the comet, will eventually disintegrate into dust themselves. Hector leaves to check if any of his family survived, but promises to return as soon as possible.

Reggie and Sam then go shopping for guns and clothing at a mall. After a firefight with some evil stock boys, the girls are taken prisoner, but are saved by a rescue team sent by the scientists. Reggie is taken back to their base. Audrey White, a disillusioned scientist, offers to dispose of Sam, whom she diagnosed as having been exposed to the comet due to her developing rash, and to wait for Hector to return. After she fakes euthanizing Sam by injecting her with only a sedative, she kills the other remaining scientist. When Hector returns after an encounter with a zombie child, Audrey briefs him on the situation and then gives herself a lethal injection (as she herself has been exposed). Sam and Hector set out to rescue Reggie.

Back at the base, it is revealed that the researchers had suspected and prepared for the comet's effects, but inadvertently left the ventilation system open and the fans running during the comet's passage. The deadly dust permeated their base. Reggie, who has become suspicious, escapes and discovers that the dying scientists have hunted down and rendered healthy survivors brain-dead. They harvest their untainted blood to keep the disease at bay while they desperately search for a cure. Reggie saves a young boy and a girl before they are processed, then unplugs the other victims from their life support machines. Sam and Hector arrive and rescue the trio and blow up the scientists.

Eventually, rain washes away the red dust, leaving the sky clear. Reggie pairs up with Hector, and they assume parental roles with the kids. Sam feels left out. Frustrated, she ignores Reggie's warning about crossing a deserted downtown street against the still-operating signal light, claiming there is nobody else left. Sam is almost run over by a sports car driven by Danny Mason Keener, a survivor about her own age. After apologizing, he invites her to go for a ride. As they drive off, the car is shown sporting the initials "DMK" on the vanity plate.

Cast

 Catherine Mary Stewart as Regina "Reggie" Belmont
 Kelli Maroney as Samantha "Sam" Belmont
 Robert Beltran as Hector Gomez
 Sharon Farrell as Doris, Reggie and Sam's stepmother
 Mary Woronov as Audrey White
 Geoffrey Lewis as Dr. Carter, the leader of the think tank
 Peter Fox as Dr. Wilson, one of the researchers
 John Achorn as Oscar
 Michael Bowen as Larry Dupree
 Devon Ericson as Minder
 Lissa Layng as Davenport
 Janice Kawaye as Sarah, the young rescued girl
 Chance Boyer as Brian, the young rescued boy
 Ivan E. Roth as Willy
 Dick Rude and Chris Pedersen as Stockboys
 Marc Poppel as Danny Mason Keener / DMK

Production
When writing the script, director Thom Eberhardt wanted to merge the idea of strong female protagonists with his love of post-apocalyptic films set in empty cities. For the women, he was inspired by Ginger Rogers. Further inspiration came from real-life teenage girls whom he met while filming PBS specials. Without telling the girls details about the script's premise, he asked them to describe how they would react to an apocalyptic event. The girls saw the scenario as an exciting adventure and only saw a downside to the experience when Eberhardt brought up the subject of dating. Using their answers, Eberhardt wrote the script to be lighthearted and adventuresome. Eberhardt initially had trouble convincing the studio to let him direct it, but they relented when he held out, as Atlantic Releasing Corporation was looking to immediately invest $700,000. Atlantic also wanted to capitalize on the success of their 1983 hit Valley Girl and the popularity of quirky drive-in films like Repo Man. The producers, Andrew Lane and Wayne Crawford, clashed with Eberhardt during filming; Eberhardt would later say that they did not understand the film and resented being assigned to such a low-budget B movie. Early in the production, they attempted to have him replaced. Regardless, Eberhardt praised their producing skill and said the film could not have been made without their help. Heather Langenkamp auditioned for the role of Samantha "Sam" Belmont and was the number one choice on the casting list but the part ultimately went to Kelli Maroney.

Release
Atlantic released Night of the Comet in the US on November 16, 1984, earning $3,580,578 in its opening weekend, coming in at third place. It stayed in theaters for six weeks and grossed $14,418,922 total in the US against a $700,000 budget. The film is also noted as one of the first mainstream films to carry the MPAA PG-13 rating.

Critical response
On Rotten Tomatoes, the film holds a 79% approval rating based on 33 reviews, with an average rating of 6.4/10. The consensus reads: "Valley Girl culture satire Night of the Comet gets lots of mileage out of its slapstick sci-fi zombie approach."

Variety wrote that Eberhardt "creates a visually arresting B-picture in the neon-primary colors of the cult hit Liquid Sky", as well as pointing out similarities with Five, The Day of the Triffids, The Omega Man, Dawn of the Dead and Last Woman on Earth. They described the film as "a successful pastiche of numerous science fiction films, executed with an entertaining, tongue-in-cheek flair that compensates for its absence in originality." Vincent Canby of The New York Times called it "a good-natured, end-of-the-world B-movie" whose "humor augments rather than upstages the mechanics of the melodrama". Neil Gaiman reviewed Night of the Comet for Imagine magazine, and stated that "one of the most amusing, witty, imaginative, and thought-provoking films I've seen that was made with no budget and is also cheap exploitation (you got all that?)."

Home media
Night of the Comet was released on VHS and Betamax videocassettes and CED Videodisc on August 30, 1985, and distributed by CBS/FOX Video. A second US VHS printing, distributed by Goodtimes Video, was released on August 30, 1990. MGM released the film on DVD in the US on March 6, 2007. The film was released in a Collector's Edition on Blu-ray by Shout! Factory on November 19, 2013. Sherilyn Connelly of The Village Voice criticized the synopsis on the back of the disc keep case, saying that it dumbs down the film and portrays the independent women as helpless stereotypes.

Soundtrack
A soundtrack for the film was released by Macola Records. The soundtrack's "Learn to Love Again", a love duet performed by Amy Holland and Chris Farren, plays during a scene between Regina and Hector and in the closing credits. Other songs include "The Whole World is Celebratin'" (also performed by Chris Farren), "Lady in Love" and "Unbelievable" by Revolver, "Strong Heart" by John Townsend, "Trouble" by Skip Adams, "Living on the Edge" by Jocko Marcellino, "Virgin in Love" by Thom Pace, "Never Give Up" by Bobby Caldwell and "Hard Act to Follow" by Diana DeWitt.

Legacy
Night of the Comet developed a cult following in the years after its release. Keith Phipps of The Dissolve wrote that the film's cult following comes from how matter-of-factly it treats its weird premise. The film was voted number 10 in Bloody Disgusting's Top 10 Doomsday Horror Films in 2009. Maroney's character was an influence on Joss Whedon when he created Buffy Summers of Buffy the Vampire Slayer.

Remake
In October 2018, Orion Pictures hired Roxanne Benjamin to write a sci-fi-horror remake of the 1984 cult classic. As of April 2019, Benjamin confirmed she had submitted her script for the remake to Orion.

References

External links

 
 
 
 
 

1984 films
1984 horror films
1980s comedy horror films
1980s science fiction comedy films
1984 independent films
American comedy horror films
American science fiction comedy films
American independent films
American science fiction action films
American science fiction horror films
American zombie films
Comets in film
Films directed by Thom Eberhardt
Films set in Los Angeles
Films shot in Los Angeles
American post-apocalyptic films
Atlantic Entertainment Group films
1980s teen comedy films
1980s teen horror films
1980s English-language films
1980s American films
Films set in shopping malls